Qatar participated in the 2010 Summer Youth Olympics in Singapore.

The Qatar squad consisted of 6 athletes competing in 5 sports: aquatics (swimming), athletics, equestrian, gymnastics and shooting.

Medalists

Athletics

Boys
Track and Road Events

Equestrian

Gymnastics

Artistic Gymnastics

Boys

Girls

Shooting

Rifle

Swimming

References

External links
 Competitors List: Qatar

Nations at the 2010 Summer Youth Olympics
2010 in Qatari sport
Qatar at the Youth Olympics